Chris Evert was the defending champion but did not compete that year.

Martina Navratilova won in the final 6–0, 6–3 against Pam Shriver.

Seeds
A champion seed is indicated in bold text while text in italics indicates the round in which that seed was eliminated.

  Martina Navratilova (champion)
  Pam Shriver (final)
  Manuela Maleeva (semifinals)
  Zina Garrison (semifinals)
  Lori McNeil (first round)
  Barbara Potter (quarterfinals)
  Katerina Maleeva (quarterfinals)
  Natasha Zvereva (quarterfinals)

Draw

References
 1988 Virginia Slims of Dallas Draw

Virginia Slims of Dallas
1988 WTA Tour